Kedestes lepenula, the chequered ranger or chequered skipper, is a butterfly of the family Hesperiidae. It is found from the central East Cape through the western part of the Free State, the eastern part of North West Province into the dry western parts of the Limpopo Province up to Polokwane. It is also found in Botswana.

There are several generations per year, but it is scarce in September. It is more common during summer with a peak from February to April.

The larvae feed on Imperata cylindrica.

References

Butterflies described in 1857
l